Eugenia Maniokova and Leila Meskhi were the defending champions but only Maniokova competed that year with Wiltrud Probst.

Maniokova and Probst lost in the quarterfinals to Elena Makarova and Maja Murić.

Meredith McGrath and Nathalie Tauziat won in the final 6–1, 6–2 against Iva Majoli and Petra Schwarz.

Seeds
Champion seeds are indicated in bold text while text in italics indicates the round in which those seeds were eliminated.

  Meredith McGrath /  Nathalie Tauziat (champions)
  Eugenia Maniokova /  Wiltrud Probst (quarterfinals)
  Karina Habšudová /  Caroline Vis (first round)
  Sandra Cecchini /  Christina Singer (first round)

Draw

External links
 1995 EA-Generali Ladies Linz Doubles draw

1995 WTA Tour